Frank Myler (4 December 1938 – 27 March 2020) was an English former professional rugby league footballer who played in the 1950s, 1960s and 1970s, and coached in the 1970s and 1980s.

Playing career
Myler played left- and scored a try in Widnes' 13–5 victory over Hull Kingston Rovers in the 1963–64 Challenge Cup Final at Wembley Stadium, London on Saturday 9 May 1964, in front of a crowd of 84,488. Myler played left- in St. Helens' 30–2 victory over Oldham in the 1968–69 Lancashire Cup Final at Central Park, Wigan on Friday 25 October 1968. Myler played at left- in St. Helens' 4–7 defeat by Wigan in the 1968 BBC2 Floodlit Trophy Final at Central Park, Wigan on Tuesday 17 December 1968.

In the 1969–70 Northern Rugby Football League season's Championship Final Myler was voted man of the match winning the Harry Sunderland Trophy in St. Helens 24–12 victory over Leeds. In 1970, he captained the Lions squad. Following a heavy defeat in the first Test the Lions under Myler did not lose another game on the whole tour. Myler remains the last British captain to lift the Ashes trophy in Australia. He played  in the 4–7 defeat by Leigh in the 1970–71 Lancashire Cup Final at Station Road, Swinton on Saturday 28 November 1970. Myler left St. Helens in 1971 to take up the position of player-coach with the Rochdale Hornets from May 1971 until October 1974.

Coaching career
After three seasons at Rochdale where he took the team to the Players No 6 trophy final, although they lost 27–16 to Warrington, Myler succeeded Vince Karalius as Widnes coach in May 1975. In May 1978 he was succeeded as Widnes coach by Doug Laughton. After periods coaching at Oldham and Swinton Myler was appointed Great Britain coach in 1983 but after some early successes the team lost all six test matches to Australia and New Zealand during the 1984 Great Brian Lions tour and despite a win over Papua New Guinea in the last test of the tour Myler was not reappointed as coach. Thereafter, he returned to club coaching with Oldham and a second spell at Widnes.

Myler coached England for one fixture beating Wales 60-13 on 28 May 1978.

Myler was one of the original thirteen former Widnes players inducted into the Widnes Hall of Fame in 1992.

Myler died on 27 March 2020 after a long illness, aged 81.

References

External links
(archived by web.archive.org) Statistics at rugby.widnes.tv
(archived by web.archive.org) Hall of Fame at rugby.widnes.tv
Hall of Fame at rugby.widnes.tv
(archived by web.archive.org) Frank Myler at rlhalloffame.org.uk
(archived by web.archive.org) Kiwis open British tours…
Search for "Frank Myler" at britishnewspaperarchive.co.uk

1938 births
2020 deaths
England national rugby league team coaches
England national rugby league team players
English rugby league coaches
English rugby league players
Great Britain national rugby league team captains
Great Britain national rugby league team coaches
Great Britain national rugby league team players
Oldham R.L.F.C. coaches
Rugby league players from Widnes
Rochdale Hornets coaches
Rugby league centres
Rugby league five-eighths
St Helens R.F.C. players
Swinton Lions coaches
Widnes Vikings coaches
Widnes Vikings players